Frank Lewis Dowling (18 October 1823 – 10 October 1867, in Norfolk Street, Strand, London) was a British newspaper editor.

Dowling, son of Vincent George Dowling, was probably born in London. He was called to the bar at the Middle Temple, 24 November 1848. He became editor of Bell's Life in London on the illness of his father in 1851. He was remarkable for his urbanity, and for the fair manner in which he discharged the duties of arbitrator and umpire in numerous cases of disputes connected with the prize-ring. He had the control of the arrangements of the international fight between Thomas Sayers and John C. Heenan, 17 April 1860, and it was by his advice that the combatants agreed to consider it a drawn battle, and to each receive a belt.

He married, 29 Oct. 1853, Frances Harriet, who was the fourth daughter of Benjamin Humphrey Smart, of 55 Connaught Terrace, Hyde Park, London.

He edited and brought out the annual issues of Fistiana, or the Oracle of the Ring, from 1852 to 1864, besides preparing a further edition which did not appear until the year after his death.

He died from consumption at his lodgings.

References

External links
G. C. Boase, ‘Dowling, Frank Lewis (1823–1867)’, rev. Dennis Brailsford, Oxford Dictionary of National Biography, Oxford University Press, 2004, accessed 29 Dec 2007

1823 births
1867 deaths
English newspaper editors
Members of the Middle Temple
19th-century British journalists
English male journalists
19th-century English male writers